Tetsuya Takeda, born April 11, 1949, is a Japanese folk singer and actor.  Takeda is perhaps most known in Japan for his starring role in the Tokyo Broadcasting System's (TBS) long-running, highly rated television drama Sannen B Gumi Kinpachi Sensei (Mr. Kinpachi of the Third-Year B Class).  The program, targeted at junior high and high school-aged adolescents, ran on TBS with Takeda at various times from 1979 until 2011.

Takeda wrote and performed several well-known songs, including the theme song for the 1985 animated movie Doraemon: Nobita's Little Star Wars (のび太の宇宙小戦争).  Takeda's 1980 song Okuru Kotoba (The Word I Give to You) is often sung or performed at junior high school and high school graduation ceremonies in Japan.

Previous to his appearance on Sannen B, Takeda studied to be a teacher at Fukuoka University of Education.  He later formed a folk music group called Kaientai.  The song Okuru Kotoba, which Takeda wrote and performed with Kaientai, actually had nothing to do with schooling, but is reportedly associated with education because of Takeda's role in the Sannen B show.

Filmography

Films
The Yellow Handkerchief (1977) – Kinya Hanada
Stage-Struck Tora-san (1978) – Tomekichi Gotō
A Distant Cry from Spring (1980) – Tamiko's cousin
The Return of Godzilla (1984) – Homeless Man
Bakumatsu Seishun Graffiti: Ronin Sakamoto Ryōma (1986) – Sakamoto Ryōma
Aitsu ni Koishite (1987)
Sailor Suit and Machine Gun: Graduation (2016)
Hanagatami (2017)
Labyrinth of Cinema (2020) – Sakamoto Ryōma
Tang and Me (2022) – Professor Masahiko Baba

Television
Kinpachi-sensei (TBS, 1979–2011) – Kinpachi Sakamoto
Kusa Moeru (NHK, 1979) – Adachi Morinaga
Bakumatsu Seishun Graffiti: Sakamoto Ryōma (NTV, 1982) – Sakamoto Ryōma
Tokugawa Ieyasu (NHK, 1983) – Toyotomi Hideyoshi
Bakumatsu Seishun Graffiti: Fukuzawa Yukichi (TBS, 1985) – Sakamoto Ryōma
Taiheiki (NHK, 1991) – Kusunoki Masashige
101st Marriage Proposal (FUJI TV, 1991)
Kōmyō ga Tsuji (NHK, 2006)
Journey Under the Midnight Sun (TBS, 2006) – Junzō Sasagaki
The Family (TBS, 2007) – Ōgame
Jin (TBS, 2009) – Ogata Kōan
Ryōmaden (NHK, 2010) – Katsu Kaishū
Jun to Ai (NHK, 2012–2013) – Zenkō Kanō
The Partner (TBS, VTV, 2013) – Inukai Tsuyoshi
The Emperor's Cook (TBS, 2015) – Professor Shōgo Kirizuka
Asa ga Kita (NHK, 2015) – Fukuzawa Yukichi
Totto TV (NHK, 2016) – Tatsuo Ōoka
Mito Kōmon (BS-TBS, 2017) – Mito Mitsukuni

Notes

References 

 
 Referenced in the Manga Akumetsu Chapter 79 volume 09 as a character Called Takeya Tesuda

External links 

1949 births
Japanese male pop singers
Japanese folk singers
Living people
People from Fukuoka Prefecture
Musicians from Fukuoka Prefecture
20th-century Japanese male actors
21st-century Japanese male actors
20th-century Japanese male singers
20th-century Japanese singers